Royal Air Force Limavady or more simply RAF Limavady is a former Royal Air Force station, also known as Aghanloo airfield, near the city of Derry, Northern Ireland.

History

The station was built in 1940 during the Second World War. The airfield was part of RAF Coastal Command and was important in the fight against U-boats in the Atlantic Ocean.

Units

The following units were also here at some point:
 No. 7 (Coastal) Operational Training Unit RAF (April 1942 - May 1944)
 No. 22 Air Crew Holding Unit
 No. 2754 Squadron RAF Regiment
 Loran Training Unit RAF (April 1945)  became Coastal Command Anti U-Boat Devices School RAF (April - August 1945)

During the Second World War the airfield was further used by the Fleet Air Arm when it was known as RNAS Limavady until 1958 when it was finally sold off.

Current use
After it was vacated by the military, the site was partly converted into an industrial estate with the rest returning to agricultural purposes. The runways and taxiways can still be seen from aerial imagery.

References

Citations

Bibliography

 

Limavady
Lim
Lim
Defunct airports in Northern Ireland
Limavady